The Sunda flying fox or Sunda fruit bat (Acerodon mackloti) is a species of bat in the family Pteropodidae. It is endemic to Indonesia. When it comes to conservation status for this species, The Sunda flying fox is in the vulnerable status, meaning this species has an Intermediate chance of becoming an endanger species by the deforestation of mangrove trees for shrimp aquaculture.

References

Mammals of Indonesia
Acerodon
Mammals described in 1837
Taxonomy articles created by Polbot
Taxa named by Coenraad Jacob Temminck
Bats of Indonesia